Prometopidia is a genus of moths in the family Geometridae, first described by George Hampson in 1902.

Species 
Prometopidia contains the following species:

 Prometopidia arenosa Wiltshire, 1961
 Prometopidia conisaria Hampson, 1902
 Prometopidia joshimathensis Dey, Uniyal, Hausmann & Stüning, 2021

References 

Geometridae